The 1956 Florida State Seminoles football team represented Florida State University as an independent during the 1956 NCAA University Division football season. Led by fourth-year head coach Tom Nugent, the Seminoles compiled a record of 5–4–1.

Schedule

References

Florida State
Florida State Seminoles football seasons
Florida State Seminoles football